Mason County is a county located in the U.S. state of Michigan. As of the 2020 Census, the population was 29,052. The county seat is Ludington.

Mason County comprises the Ludington, MI Micropolitan Statistical Area.

History

The county is named for Stevens T. Mason, Governor of Michigan from 1835 to 1840. It was created by the Michigan Legislature in 1840 as Notipekago County, then renamed Mason County in 1843. The county was administered by Ottawa County prior to the organization of county government in 1855.

Mason County, does not have an official flag.

Geography

Major highways
  – runs east–west through central part of county. Runs from Ludington through Amber, Scottville, Custer, and Branch.
  – runs NW from Ludington along shoreline of Lake Michigan to Ludington State Park.
  is a business spur running east of Ludington.

U.S. Bicycle Routes
  enters Mason County from Pentwater; has a concurrency with USBR 20; proceeds north into Manistee County
  begins (until near future) at SS Badger with US 10; has a concurrency with USBR 35; goes through Freesoil; proceeds east into Lake County; proceeds east for about 310 miles to Marine City

Adjacent counties
By land
 Manistee County – north
 Lake County – east
 Newaygo County – southeast
 Oceana County – south
By water
 Sheboygan County, Wisconsin – southwest
 Manitowoc County, Wisconsin – west

National protected area
 Manistee National Forest (part)

Demographics

As of the 2000 United States Census, of 2000, there were 28,274 people, 11,406 households, and 7,881 families in the county. The racial makeup of the county was 95.84% White, 0.73% Black or African American, 0.78% Native American, 0.28% Asian, 0.02% Pacific Islander, 0.82% from other races, and 1.53% from two or more races. 3.01% of the population were Hispanic or Latino of any race. 24.5% were of German, 10.4% Polish, 8.8% English, 8.5% Irish, 7.7% American and 5.0% Swedish ancestry. 96.0% spoke English and 2.2% Spanish as their first language.

There were 11,406 households, out of which 29.70% had children under the age of 18 living with them, 56.40% were married couples living together, 9.20% had a female householder with no husband present, and 30.90% were non-families. 26.50% of all households were made up of individuals, and 11.70% had someone living alone who was 65 years of age or older. The average household size was 2.43 and the average family size was 2.92.

The county population contained 24.20% under the age of 18, 7.10% from 18 to 24, 26.20% from 25 to 44, 25.80% from 45 to 64, and 16.80% who were 65 years of age or older. The median age was 40 years. For every 100 females there were 97.50 males. For every 100 females age 18 and over, there were 94.40 males.

The median income for a household in the county was $34,704, and the median income for a family was $41,654. Males had a median income of $33,873 versus $22,616 for females. The per capita income for the county was $17,713. About 8.20% of families and 11.00% of the population were below the poverty line, including 16.50% of those under age 18 and 7.00% of those age 65 or over.

Government
Mason County has usually voted Republican in national elections. Since 1884, the county's voters have selected the Republican Party nominee in 82% (28 of 35) of the national elections through 2020.

Mason County operates the county jail, maintains rural roads, operates the major local courts, records deeds, mortgages, and vital records, administers public health regulations, and participates with the state in the provision of social services. The county board of commissioners controls the budget and has limited authority to make laws or ordinances. In Michigan, most local government functions – police and fire, building and zoning, tax assessment, street maintenance etc. – are the responsibility of individual cities and townships.

Elected officials

 Prosecuting Attorney: Lauren Kreinbrink
 Sheriff: Kim C. Cole
 County Clerk: Cheryl Kelly
 County Treasurer: Andrew Kmetz IV
 Register of Deeds: Diane L. Englebrecht
 Drain Commissioner: Dan Rohde
 County Surveyor: Jim Nordlund
 County Board of Commissioners by district:
 District 1: Nick Kreiger
 District 2: Gary Castonia
 District 3: Jody Hartley 
 District 4: Lewis G. Squires
 District 5: Steven K. Hull
 District 6: Janet S. Anderson (chair)
 District 7: Ron Bacon

(information as of Jan 2021)

Communities

Cities
 Ludington (county seat)
 Scottville

Villages
 Custer
 Fountain
 Free Soil

Charter township
Pere Marquette Charter Township

Civil townships

Amber Township
Branch Township
Custer Township
Eden Township
Free Soil Township
Grant Township
Hamlin Township
Logan Township
Meade Township
Riverton Township
Sheridan Township
Sherman Township
Summit Township
Victory Township

Unincorporated communities
 Branch (partially)
 Chapple Corners
 Fairview
 Fern
 Ferryville
 Walhalla

Indian reservation
The Little River Band of Ottawa Indians, a federally recognized Odawa Native American tribe, occupies a small reservation of approximately  within Custer Township.  The tribe also occupy another reservation within Brown Township just north in Manistee County.

See also
 List of Michigan State Historic Sites in Mason County, Michigan
Mason County Courthouse
Mason County District Library
National Register of Historic Places listings in Mason County, Michigan

References

External links

 Mason County Press
 Mason County Website
 Mason County History Companion
 Mason County Michigan History and Directory
 Mason County Memories

 
Michigan counties
1855 establishments in Michigan
Populated places established in 1855